Ingrid Englund (24 March 1926 – 13 October 1999) was a Swedish alpine skier. She competed at the 1952 Winter Olympics and the 1956 Winter Olympics.

References

External links
 

1926 births
1999 deaths
Swedish female alpine skiers
Olympic alpine skiers of Sweden
Alpine skiers at the 1952 Winter Olympics
Alpine skiers at the 1956 Winter Olympics
People from Sundsvall
Sportspeople from Västernorrland County
20th-century Swedish women